The following outline is provided as an overview of and topical guide to the U.S. state of California.

California is the most populous and the third most extensive of the 50 states of the United States of America. California is home to Los Angeles, San Francisco, San Diego, and Sacramento, respectively the 2nd, 6th, 17th, and 23rd most populous metropolitan areas of the United States. California borders the North Pacific Ocean and Baja California in the Southwestern United States. California includes both Mount Whitney, the highest (4,421 m) mountain peak in the contiguous United States, and Death Valley, the lowest (−86 m) and hottest (56.7 °C) place in North America. California joined the Union as the 31st state on September 9, 1850.

General reference

 California state names
 Common name: California
 Pronunciation: 
 Etymology: Etymology of California
 Official name: State of California
 Abbreviations and name codes
 Postal symbol: CA
 ISO 3166-2 code: US-CA
 Internet second-level domain: .ca.us
 Historic: Cal, Cali, or Calif
 Nickname(s)
 The Golden State (previously used on license plates)
 The Bear Republic
 Adjectival: California
 Demonym: Californian, Californio
 California state symbols
 Flag of California 
 Seal of California 
 List of California state symbols, including Motto and Song
 See also: :Category:Symbols of California

Geography of California
Geography of California
 California is: a U.S. state, a federated state within the United States of America
 Location
 Northern hemisphere
 Western hemisphere
 Americas
 North America
 Anglo America
 Northern America
 United States of America
 Western United States
 West Coast of the United States
 Southwestern United States
 Population of California: 37,253,956 (2010 U.S. Census)
 Area of California:
 Atlas of California

Places in California
Places in California
 Ghost towns in California
 List of California Historical Landmarks
 National Historic Landmarks in California
 National Register of Historic Places listings in California
 Bridges on the National Register of Historic Places in California
 Category: Historic districts in California
 National Natural Landmarks in California
 Category:National parks in California
 State parks in California
 Category: Regional parks in California
 Category: Municipal parks in California
 List of museums in California

Environment of California
Environment of California
 Climate of California
 Climate change
 Natural history of California
 Protected areas in California
 State forests of California
 Superfund sites in California
 Wildlife of California
 Flora of California
 California Floristic Province
 California native plants
 California chaparral and woodlands
 Fauna of California
 Birds of California
 Mammals of California
 Repopulation of wolves in California

Natural geographic features of California
 Arches of California (natural arches)
 Canyons and gorges of California
 Caves of California
Coastal features of California
 Bays of California
 Beaches in California
 Southern California Bight
 Headlands of California
 Peninsulas of California
 Reefs of California
 Straits of California
 Deserts of California
 Dunes of California
 Forests of California
 Grasslands of California
 Islands of California
 Bodies of water in California
 Glaciers of California
 Lakes of California
 Oases of California
 Rivers of California
 Springs of California
 Waterfalls in California
 Watersheds of California
 Wetlands of California
 Mesas of California
 Mountains of California
 Hills of California
 Mountain passes in California
 Mountain ranges of California
 Mountain peaks of California
 Ridges of California
 Volcanoes of California
 Rock formations of California
 Salt flats of California
 Valleys of California

Regions of California
 Northern California
 Central California
 Central Coast (North)
 Big Sur
 Monterey Bay Area
 Salinas Valley
 Santa Cruz Mountains
 Central Valley (North)
 Sacramento Valley
 Chico Area
 Greater Sacramento
 Yuba–Sutter area
 Sutter Buttes
 Sacramento-San Joaquin River Delta
 San Joaquin Valley (North)
 Metropolitan Fresno
 Merced Area
 Modesto Area
 Stockton Area
 North Coast
 Lost Coast
 Emerald Triangle
 Klamath Mountains
 Mendocino Mountains
 San Francisco Bay Area
 East Bay
 Oakland–Alameda County
 Tri-Valley Area
 Amador Valley
 Livermore Valley
 San Ramon Valley
 North Bay
 Marin County
 Wine Country
 Napa Valley
 Russian River Valley
 Sonoma Valley
 Telecom Valley
 The Peninsula
 City and County of San Francisco
 San Mateo County
 South Bay
 Santa Clara Valley
 San Jose–Santa Clara County
 Silicon Valley
 Sierra Nevada
 Gold Country
 Lake Tahoe
 Yosemite
 Shasta Cascade
 Mount Shasta
 Redding Area
 Trinity Alps
 Tricorner Region/Surprise Valley
 Modoc Plateau
 Warner Mountains
 Southern California
 Central Coast (South) /Tri-Counties
 San Luis Obispo Area
 Five Cities
 Santa Barbara Area
 Ventura Area
 Oxnard Plain
 Central Valley (South)
 San Joaquin Valley (South)
 Bakersfield Area
 Visalia Area
 Channel Islands
 South Coast
 Greater Los Angeles
 Los Angeles Basin
 Gateway Cities
 Los Angeles City
 East Los Angeles
 Harbor Area
 South Los Angeles
 Westside
 Palos Verdes Peninsula
 South Bay
 Beach Cities
 Conejo Valley
 San Gabriel Valley
 Crescenta Valley
 Peninsular Ranges (North)
 San Jacinto Mountains
 Santa Rosa Mountains
 Pomona Valley
 Puente Hills
 Santa Clarita Valley
 San Gabriel Mountains
 San Fernando Valley
 Santa Monica Mountains
 Hollywood Hills
 Orange County Area
 Santa Ana-Anaheim-Irvine, CA
 Santa Ana
 South Coast Metro
 Santa Ana Valley
 Saddleback Valley
 Santa Ana Mountains
 San Diego–Tijuana
 San Diego metropolitan area
 North County
 North County Coastal
 North County Inland
 East County
 South Bay
 Mountain Empire
 Desert Region
 Eureka Valley
 Ivanpah Valley
 Antelope Valley
 Rainbow Basin
 Saline Valley
 Inland Empire (Riverside & San Bernardino Counties)
 Death Valley
 Mojave Desert (High Desert)
 Victor Valley
 Morongo Basin
 Coachella Valley (Palm Springs, Indio, and Mecca area)
 Eastern Coachella Valley (Mecca and vicinity)
 West Valley Region
 Cucamonga Valley
 Chino Valley
 Big Cities Region
 Riverside Area
 San Bernardino Area
 San Bernardino Valley
 San Jacinto Valley
 Mountain Areas
 San Bernardino Mountains
 Little San Bernardino Mountains
 Imperial Valley
 El Centro metropolitan area
 Sonoran Desert (Low Desert)
 Colorado Desert
 Salton Sink/Salton Sea
 Owens Valley

Administrative divisions of California

Counties of California 
The 58 Counties of the state of California

 Alameda County, California
 Alpine County, California
 Amador County, California
 Butte County, California
 Calaveras County, California
 Colusa County, California
 Contra Costa County, California
 Del Norte County, California
 El Dorado County, California
 Fresno County, California
 Glenn County, California
 Humboldt County, California
 Imperial County, California
 Inyo County, California
 Kern County, California
 Kings County, California
 Lake County, California
 Lassen County, California
 Los Angeles County, California
 Madera County, California
 Marin County, California
 Mariposa County, California
 Mendocino County, California
 Merced County, California
 Modoc County, California
 Mono County, California
 Monterey County, California
 Napa County, California
 Nevada County, California
 Orange County, California
 Placer County, California
 Plumas County, California
 Riverside County, California
 Sacramento County, California
 San Benito County, California
 San Bernardino County, California
 San Diego County, California
 San Francisco
 San Joaquin County, California
 San Luis Obispo County, California
 San Mateo County, California
 Santa Barbara County, California
 Santa Clara County, California
 Santa Cruz County, California
 Shasta County, California
 Sierra County, California
 Siskiyou County, California
 Solano County, California
 Sonoma County, California
 Stanislaus County, California
 Sutter County, California
 Tehama County, California
 Trinity County, California
 Tulare County, California
 Tuolumne County, California
 Ventura County, California
 Yolo County, California
 Yuba County, California

Municipalities in California 
Municipalities in California
 Cities in California
 State capital of California: Sacramento
 Largest city in California: Los Angeles (also called "L.A." and "The City of Angels"; second largest city in the United States).
 City nicknames in California
 Sister cities in California
 Towns in California
 Category: Unincorporated communities in California
 Category: Census-designated places in California

Special Districts of California 
 :Category:Special districts of California

Demography of California
 Demographics of California

Geology of California

Geology of California (general reference)
 Federal Authority: United States Geological Survey
 State Authority: California Geological Survey
 Museums: Geology museums in California
 Timeline: Geologic timeline of Western North America
 All related articles: Geology of California

Local Geologies of California
 Geology of California by County
 Geology of the Death Valley area
 Geology of the Lassen volcanic area
 Geology of Point Lobos area
 Geology of the Yosemite area

Economic Geology of California
 Mining in California
 Petroleum in California

Geodynamics of California
 Tectonic plates
 Gorda Plate
 North American Plate
 Pacific Plate
 Contributing geodynamic features
 Cascadia subduction zone
 Gorda Ridge
 East Pacific Rise
 Seismic faults of California
 List of earthquakes in California

Stratigraphy of California
 Stratigraphy of California
 Geologic formations of California
 Geologic groups of California
 Fossiliferous stratigraphic units in California
 Rock formations of California

Physiographic regions of California

California is part of the North American continent on the American Landmass.  Specific physiographic Divisions, Provinces, and Sections of California can be divided as follows;

 Pacific Coast Ranges division (pacific mountain system)
 Pacific Border province
 Klamath Mountains
 California Trough (Central Valley)
 Coast Ranges
 Transverse Ranges
 Northern Channel Islands
 Cascade-Sierra province
 Southern Cascade Mountains
 Sierra Nevada
 Lower California province
 Los Angeles Basin
 Peninsular Ranges (Los Angeles Range)
 Southern Channel Islands
 Intermontane Plateaus division
 Basin and Range province
 Modoc Plateau
 Great Basin
 Mojave Desert
 Salton Trough (Colorado Desert)

Government and politics of California

Politics of California
 Form of government: U.S. state government
 United States congressional delegations from California
 California State Capitol
 Elections in California
 Electoral reform in California
 Political party strength in California

Branches of the government of California
Government of California

Executive branch of the government of California
 Governor of California
 Lieutenant Governor of California
 Secretary of State of California
 State Treasurer of California
 State departments
 California Department of Transportation

Legislative branch of the government of California
 California State Legislature (bicameral)
 Upper house: California State Senate
 Lower house: California State Assembly

Judicial branch of the government of California
Courts of California
 Supreme Court of California

Law and order in California
Law of California
 Adoption in California
 Cannabis in California
 Capital punishment in California
 Individuals executed in California
 California Constitution
 Crime in California
 Organized crime in California
 Gambling in California
 Gun laws in California
 Law enforcement in California
 Law enforcement agencies in California
 California State Police
 Same-sex marriage in California

Military in California
 California Air National Guard
 California Army National Guard

Local government in California
Local government in California

History of California

History of California

History of California, by period

 Prehistory of California
 Indigenous peoples
 Arlington Springs Man
 Population of Native California
 Traditional narratives (Native California)
 History of California through 1899
 List of pre-statehood governors of California
 El Presidio Reál de San Diego established May 14, 1769
 Spanish colony of Provincia de Las Californias, June 3, 1770, to March 26, 1804
 El Presidio Reál de San Carlos de Monterey established June 3, 1770
 El Presidio Reál de San Francisco de Asis established September 17, 1776
 El Presidio Reál de Santa Barbara established April 21, 1782
 Spanish missions in California
 Ranchos of California
 History of slavery in California
 Mission Indians
 California mission clash of cultures
 Spanish colony of Alta California, March 26, 1804, to August 24, 1821
 Adams–Onís Treaty of 1819
 Mexican War of Independence, September 16, 1810, to August 24, 1821
 Treaty of Córdoba, August 24, 1821
 Mexican territory of Alta California, August 24, 1821, to December 15, 1835
 Constitution of Mexico of 1824
 Centralist Mexican department of Las Californias, December 15, 1835, to February 2, 1848
 California Trail, 1841–1869
 Mexican–American War, April 25, 1846, to February 2, 1848
 Conquest of California
 California Republic, 1846
 California Battalion
 U.S. Military Province of California, 1846–1849
 California Gold Rush, 1848–1855
 Treaty of Guadalupe Hidalgo, February 2, 1848
 U.S. Provisional Government of California, 1849–1850
 State of Deseret (extralegal), 1849–1850
 Compromise of 1850
 An Act for the Admission of the State of California
 State of California becomes 31st state admitted to the United States of America on September 9, 1850
 Rail transport in California since 1856
 Pony Express, 1860–1861
 American Civil War, April 12, 1861 – May 13, 1865
 California in the American Civil War
 First Transcontinental Telegraph completed 1861
 Anti-Coolie Act of 1862
 First transcontinental railroad completed 1869
 Sequoia National Park established on September 25, 1890
 Yosemite National Park established on October 1, 1890
 General Grant National Park established on October 1, 1890
 Sierra Club founded May 28, 1892, in San Francisco
 Spanish–American War, April 25 – August 12, 1898
 History of California 1900 to present
 1906 San Francisco earthquake, April 18, 1906
 Lassen Volcanic National Park established on August 9, 1916
 Herbert Hoover becomes 31st President of the United States on March 4, 1929
 California Agricultural Strike 1933
 World War II, September 1, 1939 – September 2, 1945
 United States enters Second World War on December 8, 1941
 Japanese American internment, 1942–1945
 Kings Canyon National Park established on March 4, 1940
 Summer of Love, 1967
 Senator Robert F. Kennedy assassinated in Los Angeles on June 6, 1968
 Redwoods National Park established on October 2, 1968
 Richard Nixon becomes 37th President of the United States on January 20, 1969
 The 1969 Santa Barbara oil spill occurs in January and February of that year
 Channel Islands National Park established on March 5, 1980
 Former governor Ronald Reagan becomes 40th President of the United States on January 20, 1981
 1989 Loma Prieta earthquake, October 17, 1989
 1994 Northridge earthquake, January 17, 1994
 Death Valley National Park designated on October 31, 1994
 Joshua Tree National Park designated on October 31, 1994
 2000–01 California electricity crisis

History of California, by region
 Counties
 History of Orange County, California
 History of Santa Clara County, California
 Cities
 History of Chico, California
 History of Los Angeles, California
 History of the San Fernando Valley to 1915
 History of Pasadena, California
 History of Piedmont, California
 History of Riverside, California
 History of Sacramento, California
 History of San Bernardino, California
 History of San Diego, California
 History of San Francisco, California
 History of San Jose, California
 History of Santa Monica, California

History of California, by subject
 Food
 History of California bread
 History of California wine
 Maritime history of California
 Marriage: History of marriage in California
 Natural history of California
 Slavery: History of slavery in California
 Territorial evolution of California
 Transportation
 History of California's state highway system
 History of rail transport in California
 Universities of California
 History of the University of California, Berkeley
 History of the University of California, Los Angeles
 History of the University of California, Riverside

Culture of California

 Cuisine of California
 Museums in California

The arts in California
 Art in California
 Music of California
 Theater in California

Clubs and Societies in California
:Category:Clubs and societies in California
 :Category:Clubhouses in California
 :Category:Gentlemen's clubs in California
 :Category:Historical societies in California
 Scouting in California

People of California 
People from California
 By location
 People from Bakersfield, California
 People from Berkeley, California
 People from Big Bear Lake, California
 People from Bolinas, California
 People from Chula Vista, California
 People from Compton, California
 People from Eureka, California
 People from Fresno, California
 People from Fullerton, California
 People from Hayward, California
 People from Long Beach, California
 People from Los Angeles
 People from Los Feliz, Los Angeles
 People from Ladera Heights
 People from Malibu, California
 People from Manhattan Beach, California
 People from Marin County, California
 People from Newport Beach, California
 People from Oakland, California
 People from Orange County, California
 People from Anaheim, California
 People from Laguna Beach, California
 People from Irvine, California
 People from Santa Ana, California (county seat)
 People from Pacific Palisades, Los Angeles
 People from Palm Springs, California
 People from Pasadena, California
 People from Rancho Cucamonga, California
 People from Riverside, California
 People from Sacramento, California
 People from San Bernardino, California
 People from San Diego
 People from La Jolla
 People from San Francisco
 People from San Jose, California
 People from Santa Barbara, California
 People from Santa Cruz, California
 People from Santa Monica, California
 People from Santa Rosa, California
 People from Stockton, California
 People from Visalia, California
 People from Whittier, California
 By government position
 California district attorneys
 United States senators from California
 City managers of San Jose, California
 Justices of the Supreme Court of California
 By ethnicity
 Indigenous peoples of California
 Hispanics and Latinos in California
 Californios
 Asian Americans in California
 African Americans in California
 White Americans in California
 By occupation
 Music directors of the Ojai Music Festival
 Musicians from the Inland Empire
 Los Angeles Pobladores
 Palm Springs Walk of Stars
 By organization
 Society of California Pioneers
 By school
 California Institute of Technology people
 California State University, Fullerton people
 California State University, San Bernardino people
 By other aspect
 People associated with the California Gold Rush

Religion in California 
:Category:Religion in California
 :Category:Buddhism in California
 :Category:Christianity in California
 The Church of Jesus Christ of Latter-day Saints in California
 Episcopal Diocese of California
 :Category:Hinduism in California
 :Category:Islam in California
 :Category:Jews and Judaism in California
 :Category:Sikhism in California
 :Category:Unitarian Universalism in California

Sports in California
Sports in California
 Professional sports teams in California

Economy and infrastructure of California
Economy of California
 California companies
 Economic regions of California
 :Category:Economy of California by county

Sectors and Industries
 Agriculture in California
 Cemeteries in California
 Communications in California
 Newspapers in California
 Radio stations in California
 Television stations in California
 Energy in California
 Power stations in California
 Renewable energy in California
 Solar power in California
 Wind power in California
 Health care in California
 Hospitals in California
 Transportation of California
 Airports in California
 Rail transport in California
 Roads in California
 U.S. Highways in California
 Interstate Highways in California
 State highways in California
 Water in California

Education in California

Education in California
 Schools in California
 School districts in California
 High schools in California
 Colleges and universities in California
 University of California
 California State University
 Stanford University

See also

 Outlines of US States
 Wikipedia templates for California
  Wikipedia navigational boxes for California

References

External links

 Cost of living in California

California
California